Friðjón Þórðarson (5 February 1923 – 14 December 2009) was an Icelandic politician and former Minister of Justice and Ecclesiastical Affairs (1980–1983). In 1989-1990 he served as the president of the West Nordic Council.

References 

1923 births
2009 deaths
Fridjon Thordarson